Karamahi (also Romanized as Karamāhī) is a village in Bajgan Rural District, Aseminun District, Manujan County, Kerman Province, Iran. At the 2006 census, its population was 217, in 61 families.

References 

Populated places in Manujan County